Those Happy Days is a 2006 French film, directed and written by Olivier Nakache & Éric Toledano and starring Marilou Berry, Jean-Paul Rouve and Omar Sy.

Synopsis
In the summer of 1992, for the first time Vincent Rousseau runs a summer camp; but, quickly runs into many difficulties that he has to deal with.

Cast

See also
 2006 in film

References

External links 
 

2006 comedy films
2006 films
French comedy films
Films directed by Olivier Nakache and Éric Toledano
2000s French-language films
2000s French films